Sultan Nazrin Muizzuddin Shah ibni Almarhum Sultan Azlan Muhibbuddin Shah Al-Maghfur-Lah (born 27 November 1956) is the 35th and current Sultan of Perak since May 2014. Co-currently, he is serving as the Deputy Yang di-Pertuan Agong since 13 December 2016. Additionally, he served as the Acting Yang di-Pertuan Agong from November 2018 to December 2018 and again in January 2019.

He is also a half-third cousin of Tunku Ismail ibni Sultan Ibrahim (the Crown Prince of Johor), since both share a common ancestor, Sultan Idris Shah I of Perak.

Early life
Sultan Nazrin Shah was born on 27 November 1956 in George Town, Penang, Malaya during the reign of his grandfather, Almarhum Sultan Yussuff Izzuddin Shah. He is the eldest son of the late Sultan of Perak, Almarhum Sultan Azlan Muhibbuddin Shah and the former Raja Permaisuri of Perak, Tuanku Bainun Binti Mohd Ali.

Academic and Intellectual Background
He studied at Sekolah Rendah Jalan Kuantan, Kuala Lumpur from 1962 to 1967 then followed by lower secondary stage at St. John's Institution, Kuala Lumpur from 1968 to 1970, and furthered his upper secondary and sixth form at The Leys School, Cambridge (UK) until 1975.

Childhood 
Sultan Nazrin Shah was born in Penang, Malaya on 27 November 1956 as the first child of Almarhum Sultan Azlan Muhibbuddin Shah ibni Almarhum Sultan Yussuff Izzuddin Shah Ghafarullahu-lah and his wife Tuanku Bainun binti Mohd Ali. Back then, his father was working as a magistrate and his mother was a teacher. His siblings are:
 sister Raja Azureen (born 9 December 1957)
 brother Raja Ashman Shah (born 28 December 1958, died 30 March 2012)
 sister Raja Eleena (born 3 April 1960)
 sister Raja Yong Sofia (born 24 June 1961)

Academic life
Sultan Nazrin was educated at St. John's Institution, Kuala Lumpur and holds a BA degree in Philosophy, Politics and Economics from Worcester College, Oxford. He also holds an MPA degree from John F. Kennedy School of Government at Harvard University, and a PhD degree in Political Economy and Government from Harvard University.

Sultan Nazrin's research interests are in the area of economic and political development in South-East and North-East Asia, historical national income accounting and economic growth in developing countries.

The Sultan has also written articles and spoken on a wide range of issues including the role of the constitutional monarchy in Malaysia, education, Islam, ethnic relations and economic development.

He has assumed the role of Financial Ambassador of the Malaysian International Islamic Financial Centre (MIFC), has been Chancellor of Universiti Malaya since 2014 and is the chairman of the Board of Governors of the Malay College Kuala Kangsar.

He is also an Eminent Fellow of the Institute of Strategic and International Studies (ISIS) Malaysia.

He was conferred an honorary Masters of Business Administration by the Cranfield Institute of Technology, United Kingdom in 1993; an honorary Doctor of Economics by Soka University, Japan, in 1999; and an honorary degree by The University of Nottingham in 2016.

Raja Muda of Perak

The Perak Sultanate does not practice Agnatic Primogeniture like the other 7 Malay Rulers of Malaysia (excluding Negeri Sembilan), so, when his father ascended to become the Sultan of Perak, he does not automatically become the Raja Muda (Crown Prince). The Sultanate practices a hierarchy system, where the Sultan appoints princes of Perak to any vacant ranks. Fortunately at that time, there were some vacancies of the 6 princes with titles ranks. On 16 February 1984, he was proclaimed as the Raja Kechil Besar of Perak, which made him 3rd in line to inherit the throne. After the death of Raja Ahmad Saifuddin ibni Almarhum Sultan Iskandar Shah, the then-Raja Muda of Perak in 1987, the Raja Muda title was passed to him due to the then-Raja Di-Hilir of Perak, Raja Ahmad Hisham ibni Raja Abdul Malik, who was 80, refused the title due to old age. He was proclaimed the Raja Muda of Perak on 15 April 1987.

Sultan of Perak
On 29 May 2014, he became the 35th Sultan of Perak on the death of his father, Sultan Azlan Shah. This momentous occasion marks the first time in almost a century that a father-son inheritance of the throne occurred in Perak due to the Sultanate not practicing Agnatic Primogeniture. It also marks the first time in centuries that the Sultan of Perak was not born in Perak as he was born in Penang.

Sultan Nazrin's full name and official title is
in Malay: Duli Yang Maha Mulia Paduka Seri Sultan Nazrin Muizzuddin Shah Ibni Almarhum Sultan Azlan Muhibbuddin Shah Maghfur-Lah, Sultan, Yang di-Pertuan dan Raja Pemerintah Negeri Perak Darul Ridzuan dan Jajahan Takluknya, D.K., D.K.S.A., D.K.A., D.M.N., D.K. (Kelantan), D.K. (Selangor), D.K.N.S, D.K. (Perlis), D.K (Kedah), D.K 1 (Johor), D.K. (Pahang), PhD (Harvard).

in English: His Royal Highness Paduka Seri Sultan Nazrin Muizzuddin Shah Ibni Almarhum Sultan Azlan Muhibbuddin Shah Maghfur-Lah, The Sultan, Sovereign Ruler and Head of the Government of Perak Abode of Grace and its dependencies, D.K., D.K.S.A., D.K.A., D.M.N., D.K. (Kelantan), D.K. (Selangor), D.K.N.S, D.K. (Perlis), D.K (Kedah), D.K 1 (Johor), D.K. (Pahang), PhD (Harvard).

Previously, he had been appointed as the Regent of Perak twice. The first time was when his father was elected as the ninth Yang Di-Pertuan Agong, where he became Regent for five years, starting from 26 April 1989 until 25 April 1994. When his father's health deteriorated in 2008, Sultan Nazrin served again as the Regent from 27 January 2008 until he ascended the throne and became the Sultan of Perak in 2014.

As the Sultan of Perak, he is also the Colonel-in-Chief of the Malaysian Army's Royal Army Engineers Regiment and Royal Army Medical Corps.

Election as Deputy Yang Di-Pertuan Agong
Sultan Nazrin was elected as the Deputy Yang Di-Pertuan Agong of Malaysia on 14 October 2016. The appointment took effect on 13 December 2016.

Regency
On 2 November 2018, Sultan Nazrin was proclaimed as the Acting Yang Di-Pertuan Agong after Sultan Muhammad V was on medical leave. He ended his duties on 31 December 2018. However, due to the sudden abdication of Sultan Muhammad V as the 15th Yang Di-Pertuan Agong on 6 January 2019, he again became the Acting King the very next day whilst the Conference of Rulers elects the 16th Yang Di-Pertuan Agong on 24 January 2019 and the subsequent swearing-in ceremony on 31 January 2019.

In the 251st Meeting of the Conference of Rulers, while Sultan Abdullah of Pahang was elected as the 16th Yang Di Pertuan Agong, Sultan Nazrin was re-elected as the Deputy King for a new 5-year term effective on 31 January 2019. His regency as Acting King ended effective at the stroke of midnight on 31 January 2019.

Marriage
Sultan Nazrin married Zara Salim Davidson at Istana Iskandariah, Bukit Chandan, on 17 May 2007. Sultan Nazrin and Tuanku Zara had known each other for eight years prior to the wedding.

The day after the wedding there was a ceremony to bestow Tuanku Zara Salim with the official title of Raja Puan Besar (Crown Princess) of Perak. Sultan Nazrin's father proclaimed Tuanku Zara Salim as the Raja Puan Besar of Perak and conferred the Darjah Kerabat on her.

The first child of the couple, Raja Azlan Muzzaffar Shah, was born on 14 March 2008, followed by Raja Nazira Safya Shah, was born on 2 August 2011.

Children and their date of birth

Recognitions

Places named after him
Several places were named after him, including:
 Raja Muda Nazrin Bridge in Lenggong, Perak
 Raja Dr. Nazrin Shah Mosque in Ipoh, Perak
 Raja Dr. Nazrin Shah Residential College, a residential college at University of Malaya, Kuala Lumpur
 Sekolah Menengah Raja Dr. Nazrin Shah, a secondary school in Perak Tengah, Perak
 Jalan Raja Dr. Nazrin Shah in Ipoh, Perak
 Kolej Perikanan Sultan Nazrin Muizzuddin Shah in Lumut, Perak
 The Sultan Nazrin Shah Centre at Worcester College, Oxford, UK
Masjid Sultan Nazrin Muizzudin Shah in Tapah, Perak

Ancestry

References

External links

 Official Webpage of the Office of the Sultan of Perak

1955 births
Nazrin Shah
Living people
Nazrin Shah
Malaysian Muslims
Malaysian people of Malay descent
First Classes of Royal Family Order of Selangor
Second Classes of Royal Family Order of Selangor
First Classes of the Royal Family Order of Johor
Alumni of Worcester College, Oxford
People from Penang
21st-century Malaysian politicians
Harvard Kennedy School alumni
Recipients of the Order of the Crown of the Realm
First Classes of the Family Order of the Crown of Indra of Pahang